Yevgeni Vladimirovich Glukhov (born 1 March 1976) is a Russian former professional footballer who played as a midfielder.

Playing career
Glukhov progressed through the youth academy of Geolog in Tyumen. As a senior player, he began to play for amateur team Stroitel Tyumen, before moving to the reserve team of Dynamo-Gazovik Tyumen. From 1996 to 1998, he played in the second division for Irtysh Tobolsk.

In the summer transfer window of 1998, he returned to Tyumen – formerly Geolog – as the club was experiencing financial problems and was an outsider of the top division. He made his league debut on 15 July 1998 against Lokomotiv Moscow, and scored his first goal on 22 August against Baltika Kaliningrad. In his first six months, he made 13 matches in the top flight and scored one goal.

From 1999 to 2001, he played in the top division for Baltika, but failed to become a starter, playing 33 matches in two-and-a-half seasons. In the summer of 2001, he returned to Tyumen, where he spent a season and a half in the second division, then played for three years at the amateur level.

Managerial career
In 2011, Glukhov was appointed coach of Tyumen's youth team. In 2013–14, he worked as an executive at futsal club "Tyumen", where he in 2014 became team leader.

Personal life
His son Yegor Glukhov (born 1998) is also a professional footballer.

References

1976 births
Living people
Russian footballers
FC Tyumen players
Russian Premier League players
FC Baltika Kaliningrad players
Association football midfielders